Random Violence is the ninth album by American rap group South Central Cartel.

Track listing 
 Intro
 Wild Wild West (featuring Micc Multiee)
 Khaki's, T-Shirts, Chuccz
 Neva Got Caught
 Like a Gangsta
 Face and Blast (featuring CPO and Sandman)
 Like It Slow (featuring Micc Multiee)
 I'll Take (featuring Bokie Loc and Black Poverty)
 The Drama (featuring Gangsta Wayne and YMS)
 Do the Lo-Low (featuring Gangsta Wayne)
 What ! (featuring Micc Multiee)
 Paints and Shells
 Da Blocc (featuring Dina Rae)
 Tried and True (featuring Bokie Loc)
 C.O.D. (Cartel or Die) (featuring Leah)
 Can U Make Me Get Live (featuring Tha Floc Gang)
 Do Low (featuring Tha Floc Gang)
 Keep It Gee (featuring Detrimental)
 Fully Loaded Strap (featuring NME and Tha Floc Gang)
 Ain't Real (featuring Daddy Dee)

2004 albums
South Central Cartel albums
Albums produced by Prodeje